Various notable individuals in many professions attended Villanova University at some point in their educational careers.  Many influential and important individuals in the fields of government, business, economics, education, entertainment, arts, fashion, athletics and the sciences are alumni of Villanova.

Arts, entertainment, and journalism
 Emily Barkann - Emmy award-winning journalist and White House correspondent
 Maria Bello - Golden Globe-nominated actress
 Victor Buono - Academy Award-nominated actor 
 Ryan J. Condal - screenwriter, TV series co-creator, executive producer
 Bradley Cooper - Academy Award-nominated actor (attended for one year before transferring to Georgetown University)
 Jim Croce - recording artist
 Carmen Gentile - Journalist, Author and Public Speaker 
 Tim Hauser - singer and founder of the vocal group The Manhattan Transfer
 Michael Hollinger - playwright and screenwriter
 Vahan Janjigian - former Forbes magazine columnist; author of Even Buffett Isn't Perfect and The Forbes/CFA Institute Investment Course
 Keith Jones - Emmy award-winning news anchor and reporter at WCAU in Philadelphia, Pennsylvania
 Toby Keith - recording artist (attended for one year, received honorary degree)
 Monica Malpass - M.A. in political science in 1999; news anchor and reporter for WPVI
 Gerald Marzorati - editor of The New York Times Magazine; assistant managing editor of The New York Times
 Don McLean - recording artist (attended for three months and did not receive a degree)
 Andrew McKeough - Cappie award-winning actor (Turn: Washington's Spies) and photojournalist
 Ryan Montbleau - recording artist
 Vincent Piazza - actor (attended for a year; did not graduate)
 David Rabe - playwright (Hurlyburly) and screenwriter (Casualties of War, The Firm)
 Murtaza Razvi - journalist, Senior Assistant Editor and Head of Magazines, Dawn, Political Analyst, The Indian Express
 Greg Rikaart - Emmy Award-winning actor, currently starring in the daytime soap opera, The Young and the Restless
 Jennifer Santiago - Emmy Award-winning reporter, CBS4 News, Miami
 Cole Sternberg - visual artist
 Philip Terzian - literary editor, The Weekly Standard, author (Architects of Power: Roosevelt, Eisenhower and the American Century)
 Mary Walter - on-air personality, radio show host, political commentator

Business, law, and economics
 Ayman Asfari - British-Syrian businessman, CEO of Petrofac
 Stephen Bienko - Olympic gold medalist trainer and entrepreneur
 Robert J. Bolger - co-founder, former president and chief executive officer of National Association of Chain Drug Stores
 Dominic J. Caruso - former chief financial officer and vice chairman of Johnson & Johnson
 John Drosdick - chief executive officer, Sunoco
 Joseph Dugan - president and CEO, L.B. Foster Company
 John Eleuthère du Pont
 José Fanjul - billionaire sugar baron
 Robert Genuario - Former Connecticut State Senator, Connecticut Superior Court judge
 Chris Gheysens (VSB, 1993) - president and CEO of Wawa Inc.
 Brian Higgins billionaire hedge fund manager of King Street Capital Management
 James Kim - chairman of Amkor Technology
 Thomas G. Labrecque - former CEO of Chase Manhattan Bank
 James Mullen - president and chief executive officer, Biogen Idec
 Jerry Pappert - Judge of the United States District Court for the Eastern District of Pennsylvania,; Attorney General of Pennsylvania 2003–2005;
 Ronald O. Perelman - billionaire CEO of Mackandrews and Forbes (one semester in 1960, before transferring to University of Pennsylvania)
 Michael G. Rubin - drop-out billionaire CEO of eBay Enterprise
 Paul V. Scura - former Executive Vice President and Head of Investment Bank of Prudential Securities
 David Worby - trial lawyer who specializes in personal injury cases, most notably Ground Zero illnesses
 John Waldron - American criminal defense lawyer

Education, engineering, and the sciences
 Andrew M. Allen - NASA astronaut and Space Shuttle pilot
 Sean M. Carroll - theoretical physicist
 Steve Chen - computer engineer, principal architect of Cray X-MP supercomputer
 Nance Dicciani - chemical engineer, ranked one of The World's 100 Most Powerful Women
 Michael Greene - philosophy and religious studies professor at Bradley University 
 Edward Guinan - astronomer, discovered Neptune's ring system
 John L. Hennessy - retired President of Stanford University
 Jamie Hyneman - co-host and Executive Producer of Mythbusters (honorary Doctor of Engineering and co-advisor of VU COE senior capstone project)
 Deirdre Imus - Head of the Deidre Imus Environmental Center for Pediatric Oncology
 John P. Jones - retired Chairman and CEO of Air Products and Chemicals
 Christopher Lee - Director of Philanthropy of the Scripps Research Institute
 Emanuel Rubin - American pathologist known for his achievements in clinical and laboratory research, and medical education

Government, politics, and military
 Kelly Ayotte - former U.S. Senator from the State of New Hampshire
 Jill Biden - First Lady of the United States
 David A. Christian - retired United States Army captain and former candidate for the Republican nomination in the 2012 United States Senate election in Pennsylvania
 Joseph Clancy - former director of the U.S. Secret Service
 George B. Crist - General - first Marine to be designated Commander in Chief, Central Command
 Christopher G. Donovan - Speaker of the Connecticut House of Representatives
 Walter Doran - Admiral, U.S. Navy (retired)
 William J. Fallon - Admiral, U.S. Navy, and Commander of United States Central Command
Peter Doocy - White House Correspondent for Fox News 
 Charlie Gerow - political consultant, commentator and lawyer
D. Barry Gibbons - member of the Pennsylvania House of Representatives, Delaware County from 1961 to 1962
 David Girard-diCarlo - nominated as the U.S. Ambassador to Austria
 Joseph Hare - Rear Admiral, U.S. Navy
 Kate M. Harper - Member of the Pennsylvania House of Representatives since 2001
 Jerramiah T. Healy - Mayor, Jersey City, New Jersey
 Charles A. Heimbold, Jr. - former U.S. ambassador to Sweden and former chairman of Bristol-Myers Squibb; endowed Villanova's Heimbold Chair of Irish Studies
 Paul X. Kelley - retired Marine general and former Commandant of the Marine Corps
 John LaFalce -  former U.S. Congressman from New York state, 1975–2002
 Frank J. Larkin - Sergeant at Arms of the U.S. Senate
 William J. Martini - district court judge for the United States District Court for the District of New Jersey
 Joseph J. McMenamin - Brigadier General, U.S. Marine Corps
Nicholas Micozzie - Pennsylvania State Representative for the 163rd district (1979-2014)
 Charles A. Murphy - member of the Massachusetts House of Representatives and chairman of the House Ways and Means Committee
Rinaldo Nazzarro - Founder and leader of political group The Base
Peter O'Keefe - Pennsylvania State Representative 1975-1978
 Samuel J. Paparo Jr. - Admiral, US Navy, 64th Commander of the Pacific Fleet;
 Jerry Pappert - Attorney General of Pennsylvania 2003–2005; Judge of the United States District Court for the Eastern District of Pennsylvania,
 John A. Pica, Jr. - State Senator in Maryland, 1983–1997;Delegate, 1979–1983. Lobbyist and attorney, Pica & Associates, LLC
 Dominic Pileggi - State Senate Majority Leader of Pennsylvania
 Stanley A. Prokop - former U.S. Congressman from Pennsylvania, 1959–1961
 James M. Quigley - former U.S. Congressman from Pennsylvania
 Ed Rendell - former Pennsylvania governor and general chair of the Democratic National Committee in 2000
 Marjorie Rendell - former first lady of Pennsylvania; federal judge for the U.S. Court of Appeals for the Third Circuit
 John G. Rowland - former Connecticut governor, 1995–2004
 Matthew J. Ryan - former member of the Pennsylvania House of Representatives; Speaker of the Pennsylvania House of Representatives
 Dick Schulze - former U.S. congressman from the State of Pennsylvania, 1975–1993
 Donald Snyder (J.D. 1982) - Member of the Pennsylvania House of Representatives, 1981–2000; Majority Whip
 Xavier Suarez - former Mayor of Miami
 Dan Truitt - Pennsylvania House of Representatives
 Anthony Zinni - General, U.S. Marine Corps (retired); former Commander in Chief of U.S. Central Command (CENTCOM)

Religion and philosophy
 Michael Francis Burbidge - Bishop of the Roman Catholic Diocese of Arlington
 Salvador Miranda - church historian
 John Joseph O'Connor - cardinal and Archbishop of the Archdiocese of New York

Sports and athletics

 Malik Allen - former professional basketball player, currently an assistant coach with the Miami Heat
 Ryan Arcidiacono - professional basketball player, currently with the New York Knicks, most outstanding player of the 2016 NCAA Men's Division I Basketball Tournament
 Paul Arizin - former professional basketball player, member of Basketball Hall of Fame, voted one of the 50 all-time greatest in NBA history in 1996
 Al Atkinson - professional football player, starting linebacker for the Super Bowl Champion 1969 New York Jets
James Bell (born 1992) - professional basketball player for Japanese team Passlab Yamagata Wyverns
 Michael Bradley - former professional basketball player, NBA and European leagues
 Don Bragg - 1960 Olympic pole vaulting gold medalist
 Rolando Cruz - three-time Olympic pole vaulter for Puerto Rico
 Eamonn Coghlan - track and field athlete, four-time Olympian and the only man over age 40 to run a sub-four-minute mile
 Jim Curtin - former Major League Soccer player and current head coach of the Philadelphia Union
 Ron Delany - track and field athlete, gold medalist in 1500 meters at the 1956 Olympic Games
 Denise Dillon - VU Hall of Fame; Drexel University Head Women's Basketball Coach
 Tim Donaghy - former professional basketball referee
 Jumbo Elliott - track and field coach, inducted into National Track & Field Hall of Fame, 1981
 Brian Finneran - former professional football player, Philadelphia Eagles ('99) and Atlanta Falcons (2000–2009), Walter Payton Award winner 1997
 Michael Fitzmaurice - swimmer, Gold medal winner 1967 Pan American Games, former USA and NCAA record holder, 8 time All American
 Chris Ford - former professional basketball player and coach of the Milwaukee Bucks, Boston Celtics, Los Angeles Clippers and Philadelphia 76ers
 Randy Foye - former professional basketball player
 Stan Galazin - professional football player
 Josh Hart - professional basketball player, currently playing with the New Orleans Pelicans
 Darrun Hilliard (born 1993) - basketball player for Maccabi Tel Aviv of the Israeli Basketball Premier League
 Larry James - track and field athlete, 1968 Olympic gold and silver medalist in 1600 m relay and 400 m, respectively; Director of Athletics and Recreation at Richard Stockton College of New Jersey
 Wali Jones - former professional basketball player
 Kerry Kittles - former professional basketball player with the New Jersey Nets and Los Angeles Clippers, First Team Basketball All-American 1996
 Marty Liquori -  track and field athlete, competed in the 1968 Olympics as a freshman in the 1500 meter
 Howie Long - former professional football player and Pro Football Hall of Fame inductee, Oakland Raiders (1981–1993), football analyst, actor
 Kyle Lowry - professional basketball player, 2019 NBA Champion, currently with the Miami Heat
 Art Mahan - former professional baseball player for the Philadelphia Phillies, United States Navy officer, Villanova baseball coach and athletic director
 Sydney Maree - track and field athlete, 1988 Olympian, three NCAA titles (1500: 1980, 81; 5000: 1979)
 Bill Melchionni - former professional basketball player, number retired by NBA Nets
 John Mellus - professional football player - named All-American while at Villanova
 Jimmy Murray - former general manager of the Philadelphia Eagles, co-founder of Ronald McDonald House
 Marcus O'Sullivan - Villanova University Head Coach; three-time indoor world champion; four-time Olympian
 Sonia O'Sullivan - track and field athlete, 2000 Olympic silver medalist in 5000 m
 Don Paige - track and field athlete
 Richie Phillips - lawyer, players' agent, former head of MLB Umpires and NBA officials unions
 Ed Pinckney - former professional basketball player, MVP of 1985 Final Four, member of 1985 National Championship winning basketball team 
 John Pinone - Second Team Basketball All-American, 1983 
 Howard Porter - former professional basketball player, First Team Basketball All-American 1971
 Summer Rappaport - triathlete, 2020 Olympic Games
 Allan Ray - former professional basketball player
 Kevin Reilly - former professional football player
 Scottie Reynolds - professional basketball player for Polish team Stal Ostrów Wielkopolski; First Team Basketball All-American 2009
 Browning Ross - Olympic long-distance runner (1948 and 1952) and gold medal winner at the 1951 Pan American Games
 Mike Seamon - professional soccer player for MLS Seattle Sounders
 Mike Siani – NFL wide receiver, No. 1 draft choice of the Oakland Raiders
 Rory Sparrow - former professional basketball player
 Art Spector (1920–1987) - Boston Celtics basketball player
 Matt Szczur - former professional baseball player; member of 2009 National Championship winning football team 
 Tim Thomas - former professional basketball player
 Raymond Ventrone - former professional football player,currently special teams coach for the Indianapolis Colts; 2008 Super Bowl participant with NFL Patriots 
 Doug West - former professional basketball player; unsuccessfully recruited by then-Pitt assistant coach John Calipari
 Brian Westbrook - former professional football player, 2001 Walter Payton Award winner, 2006 Super Bowl participant with Philadelphia Eagles

References

External links
 Villanova University Office of Alumni Relations
 Villanova University

 
Villanova University alumni